The Urban Community of Lyon, also known as Grand Lyon (i.e. "Greater Lyon") or by its former acronym COURLY, is the former intercommunal structure gathering the city of Lyon (France) and some of its suburbs. It was created in January 1969.

The "Metropolis of Lyon" replaced the Urban Community on January 1, 2015.

The Urban Community of Lyon encompasses only the core of the metropolitan area of Lyon. Communes further away from the centre of the metropolitan area have formed their own intercommunal structures, such as:

 Syndicate of New Agglomeration of L'Isle-d'Abeau: 38,769 inhabitants
 Community of Communes of the East of Lyon: 27,706 inhabitants
 Community of Communes of the Garon Valley: 27,515 inhabitants

Communes included in the Urban Community

The Urban Community originally comprised 55 communes. However, on 1 January 2007, two additional communes, Givors and Grigny, joined, bringing the total up to 57. These two communes are detached from the rest of the Urban Community, as Millery (the commune linking Grigny with Charly and Vernaison) and neighbouring villages refused to join the Urban Community. On 1 January 2011, Lissieu, joined and on 1 June 2014, Quincieux, bringing the total to 59.

The Communauté urbaine comprised the following communes:

Albigny-sur-Saône
Bron
Cailloux-sur-Fontaines
Caluire-et-Cuire
Champagne-au-Mont-d'Or
Charbonnières-les-Bains
Charly
Chassieu
Collonges-au-Mont-d'Or
Corbas
Couzon-au-Mont-d'Or
Craponne
Curis-au-Mont-d'Or
Dardilly
Décines-Charpieu
Écully
Feyzin
Fleurieu-sur-Saône
Fontaines-Saint-Martin
Fontaines-sur-Saône
Francheville
Genay
Givors
Grigny
Irigny
Jonage
Limonest
Lissieu
Lyon
Marcy-l'Étoile
Meyzieu
Mions
Montanay
La Mulatière
Neuville-sur-Saône
Oullins
Pierre-Bénite
Poleymieux-au-Mont-d'Or
Quincieux
Rillieux-la-Pape
Rochetaillée-sur-Saône
Saint-Cyr-au-Mont-d'Or
Saint-Didier-au-Mont-d'Or
Saint-Fons
Sainte-Foy-lès-Lyon
Saint-Genis-Laval
Saint-Genis-les-Ollières
Saint-Germain-au-Mont-d'Or
Saint-Priest
Saint-Romain-au-Mont-d'Or
Sathonay-Camp
Sathonay-Village
Solaize
Tassin-la-Demi-Lune
La Tour-de-Salvagny
Vaulx-en-Velin
Vénissieux
Vernaison
Villeurbanne

References

External links
 Urban Community of Lyon website (in French)

Lyon
Geography of Lyon
Geography of Rhône (department)
States and territories established in 1969
States and territories disestablished in 2015